Jean Émile Butin (20 September 1925 - 20 December 1998) was a French field hockey player who competed in the 1948 Summer Olympics.

References

External links
 

1925 births
1998 deaths
French male field hockey players
Olympic field hockey players of France
Field hockey players at the 1948 Summer Olympics